ArtLifting is a benefit corporation founded by Liz Powers and her brother Spencer Powers in 2013 that connects socially conscious companies with talented artists impacted by homelessness or disabilities. ArtLifting is headquartered in Boston, MA but works with nearly 150 different artists across 30 different states.

History 

ArtLifting co-founder, Liz Powers, began her mission in Boston when she was 18. As a sophomore in college, she joined LIFT, a national nonprofit organization that empowers families to break the cycle of poverty. There, Liz was trained to work with the homeless and helped clients grapple with housing issues, unemployment, and self-esteem. 

Through the support from a grant at Harvard, Liz embarked on a yearlong project establishing art groups in local shelters so that residents could come together, make art, and earn one another's trust and companionship. Liz was struck by the incredible talent that she saw in these programs and was saddened to learn that most works produced in these groups inevitably got discarded or ended up forgotten in the closets and basements of shelters. In 2011 she created City Heart, an art show in Boston's Prudential Center that brings together roughly 70 artists from eight local homeless shelters. Still, Powers wanted more. Liz's brother Spencer, a 2007 graduate of Boston College and current student at Massachusetts Institute of Technology's Sloan School of Management, joined her to help with finances and logistics for the now-annual event.
 
In November 2013, the siblings founded ArtLifting with four Boston-based artists. During their first week of operations, those four artists earned thousands of dollars and were interviewed by national and local media. Liz and Spencer realized that art could be a transformational path to financial stability for these artists—they just needed a digital marketplace to connect with a larger audience. Since ArtLifting's founding, the company has grown to support over 150 artists in 19 states.

In October 2015, ArtLifting announced that it raised $1.1 million in seed funding.

Business Model

ArtLifting offers artists impacted by homelessness or disability the opportunity to secure their own income through the sale of original paintings, prints, and products.

Benefit Corporation Status

ArtLifting was established as a for-profit benefit corporation, rather than a non-profit 501(c)3. Benefit corporations “have a corporate purpose to create a material positive impact on society and the environment; and are required to consider the impact of their decisions not only on shareholders but also on workers, community, and the environment.” Many companies that are well known for bringing about positive social or environmental impact are benefit corporations such as  Patagonia, Etsy, and Warby Parker.

Liz Powers had worked within nonprofit organizations for eight years before creating ArtLifting and believed that the amount of time non-profit organizations typically spend on fundraising would be stifling given the impact she wanted to make and believed that being a for-profit social enterprise would enable ArtLifting to focus on sustainably growing.

As with any for-profit art broker, proceeds are split between artists and ArtLifting. Every artist earns 55% from the profit of each sale. 1% from each sale go toward strengthening art services for community partners that support ArtLifting artists, which includes art programming at social service agencies, shelters, and disability centers. ArtLifting the invests the remaining 44% back into the company to further its mission.

Recruiting Artists
ArtLifting works with individuals who participate in shelter or disability center art programs across the U.S. There are thousands of existing art groups in shelters and disability centers. Their first point of contact is most often the art director who oversees the artists in these programs. ArtLifting's curation team reviews all artwork to determine appropriate fit for ArtLifting's platform and various sales channels including sales of originals, prints, products, and corporate opportunities.

Artists 
Scott Benner struggled to find work after the company he worked for closed in 2009. Several years later Benner was diagnosed with Horner's syndrome, making it nearly impossible for him to get and keep a job. Benner eventually lost his house in 2013 and became homeless. Benner had created intricate black and white ink drawings his whole life, but had never thought of selling them before his partnership with ArtLifting. Each individual piece can take up to 1,000 hours of work.

Allen Chamberland has chronic obstructive pulmonary disease, which prevented him from finishing his degree in social work. The disease makes it nearly impossible for Chamberland to obtain a traditional job since he “can’t walk 10 or 15 feet without getting out of breath.” Chamberland uses an exacto knife and black pieces of paper to create his intricate paper-cut masterpieces. Chamberland said, “I still wake up surprised some mornings that this is actually working… People like my work … And without the encouragement and opportunity provided by ArtLifting, I never would have found this out.”

David McCauley injured his spinal cord in a diving accident in 2008. McCauley is an artist himself and is the founder of Rise Up Gallery, “a nonprofit organization that provides free art therapy workshops to the community and a venue in which emerging artists can exhibit their work.” McCauley partnered with ArtLifting to allow him to allocate more time to the creation of various types of artwork.

References

Arts organizations based in Massachusetts
Arts organizations established in 2013
2013 establishments in Massachusetts
2013 in Boston
Organizations based in Boston